The 1991–92 season was the 90th in the history of the Western Football League.

The league champions for the first time in their history were Weston-super-Mare, who were promoted to the Southern League. The champions of Division One were Westbury United.

Final tables

Premier Division
The Premier Division remained at 21 clubs after Barnstaple Town and Radstock Town were relegated to the First Division. Two clubs joined:

Elmore, runners-up in the First Division.
Minehead, champions of the First Division.

First Division
The First Division was increased from 21 clubs to 22, after Minehead and Elmore were promoted to the Premier Division, and Yeovil Town Reserves left the league. Four new clubs joined:

Barnstaple Town, relegated from the Premier Division.
Bishop Sutton, promoted from the Somerset Senior League.
Brislington, promoted from the Somerset Senior League.
Radstock Town, relegated from the Premier Division.

References

1991-92
6